Leanne, LeAnne, Leann, LeAnn, Lee-Anne, Lee Anne, Lee-Ann, Lee Ann, Li-Anne, etc. are female given names and may refer to one of the following people:

Leann, LeAnn, and Leeann
 Leann Birch (1946-2019), American developmental psychologist
 Leann Fennelly (born 1990), Irish camogie player and student
 Leann Hunley (born 1955), American television actress
 Leann Tilley, Australian biology professor
 LeAnn Lemberger (born 1954), American writer
 LeAnn Rimes (born 1982), American singer, songwriter, actress, and author
 Leeann Chin (1933-2010), Chinese-born American restaurateur, entrepreneur, and businesswoman
 Leeann Dempster, Scottish football executive
 Leeann Tingley, Miss Rhode Island U.S.A. 2006
 Leeann Tweeden (born 1973), American radio broadcaster, model, and sports commentator

Leanne and LeAnne
 Leanne Armand (born 1968), professor and marine scientist
 Leanne Baird, 1998 Miss Canada International
 Leanne Baker (born 1981), former New Zealand professional tennis player, and former American club rugby player
 Leanne Banks (born 1959), American writer of romance novels
 Leanne Barrette (born 1967), American professional bowler on the Professional Women's Bowling Association (P.W.B.A.) Tour
 Leanne Bartolo (born 1987), current W.F.F. European Bikini champion
 Leanne Bautista (born 2010), Filipina child actress
 Leanne Benjamin (born 1964), Australian ballet dancer
 Leanne Best (born 1979), English actress
 Leanne Betasamosake Simpson (born 1971), Mississauga Nishnaabeg writer, musician, and academic from Canada
 Leanne Brown, member of British garage duo Sweet Female Attitude
 Leanne Callaghan (born 1972), English ski mountaineer and mountain climber
 Leanne Caret (born 1966), American businesswoman, Boeing executive vice president, president and C.E.O. of Boeing Defense, Space, & Security (B.D.S.), and server of the United Service Organizations (U.S.O.) governor board
 Leanne Castley (born 1974), parliament member in the Australian Capital Territory Legislative Assembly representing the liberals; country singer
 Leanne Champ (born 1983), English football player and coach
 Leanne Chinery (born 1981), Canadian international lawn bowler
 Leanne Choo (born 1991), Australian badminton player
 Leanne Clare (born 1962), current Director of Public Prosecution in Queensland
 Leanne Cope, English ballet dancer and theatre actress
 Leanne Crichton (born 1987), Scottish footballer
 Leanne Davis (born 1985), former English international cricketer
 Leanne Del Toso (born 1980), Australian wheelchair basketball player
 Leanne Donaldson, Australian politician
 Leanne Frahm, Australian fiction writer
 Leanne Francis (born 1957), former Australian swimmer
 Leanne Franson (born 1963), Canadian illustrator and cartoonist
 Leanne Ganney (born 1991), English ice hockey player
 Leanne Guinea (born 1985), Australian slalom canoeist
 Leanne Hall (footballer) (born 1980), English football goalkeeper and coach
 Leanne Harrison (born 1958), retired Australian tennis player
 Leanne Harte, Irish musician, composer, singer and songwriter
 Leanne Hinton, emerita linguistics professor at the University of California at Berkeley
 Leanne Holland (1978-1991), Australian murder victim
 LeAnne Howe (born 1951), author and scholar at the University of Illinois at Urbana-Champaign
 Leanne Johnston, Canadian hiker
 Leanne Jones (born 1985), British actress
 Leanne Kemp, Australian tech entrepreneur
 Leanne Kiernan (born 1999), Irish footballer
 Leanne Krueger, American politician from Pennsylvania
 Leanne Lakey (born 1978), British actress
 Leanne "Lelee" Lyons (born 1973), American member of the vocal group SWV
 Leanne Li (born 1984), former Canadian beauty queen
 Leanne Linard (born 1980), Australian politician
 Leanne Liu (born 1959), Hong Kong actress
 Leanne M Williams, professor in psychiatry and behavioral sciences at Stanford University
 Leanne Macomber, American member of the vocal group Young Ejecta
 Leanne Manas (born 1974), South African television presenter
 Leanne Marshall (born 1980), American fashion designer and winner of season 5 of Project Runway
 Leanne Mitchell (born 1983), English singer and winner of the first series of The Voice UK
 Leanne Moore (born 1984), winner of the 2008 series of You're a Star
 Leanne O'Sullivan, Irish poet
 Leanne Pittsford (born 1980/1981), American entrepreneur
 Leanne Pompeani (born 1996), Australian long-distance runner
 Leanne Pooley, Canadian-born New Zealand film maker
 Leanne Ratcliffe (born 1980), Australian YouTube personality, vegan activist, speaker, and author
 Leanne Redman, American physiologist and obesity expert
 Leanne Riley (born 1993), English rugby union player
 Leanne Rivlin (born 1929), an originator of the Environmental Psychology Doctoral Program at The Graduate Center of The City University of New York during the late 1960s
 Leanne Ross (born 1981), Scottish women's football midfielder
 Leanne Rowat, Canadian politician
 Leanne Rowe (born 1982), English actress and singer
 Leanne Rycroft (born 1969), Australian gymnast
 Leanne Schuster (born 1973), American indoor volleyball and beach volleyball player
 Leanne Shapton (born 1973), Canadian artist and graphic novelist
 Leanne Smith (born 1987), American World Cup alpine ski racer
 Leanne Spencer, Canadian winner of Supermodel of the World in 1996
 Leanne Tander (born 1980), Australian racecar driver
 Leanne Teale (born 1970), Canadian serial killer and rapist
 Leanne Tiernan (1984-2000), English murder victim
 Leanne Trimboli (born 1975), former Australian soccer goalkeeper
 Leanne van den Hoek (born 1958), officer of the Royal Netherlands Army
 Leanne Van Dyk (born 1955), American reformed theologian and theological educator
 Leanne Walker (born 1968), former New Zealand basketball player
 Leanne Wilson (born 1980), British actress
 Leanne Wong (born 2003), American gymnast
 Leanne Wood (born 1971), Plaid Cymru member of the National Assembly for Wales

Fictional characters
 Leanne Battersby, from the British television soap Coronation Street
 Leanne Black-Johnson, from the New Zealand soap Shortland Street
 Leanne Buxton, from the British television series Bad Girls
 Leanne Holiday, from the British soap Hollyoaks and its Internet spin-off Hollyoaks: Freshers
 Leanne Johnstone, from the BBC Scotland soap River City
 Leanne Macintosh, from the American television series Matlock
 Leanne Powell, from the British soap Brookside
 Leanne Taylor, from the American comedy-drama series Orange Is the New Black
 Leanne Grayson, main protagonist and title chaarcter in Apple's 2019-2023 supernatural, physiological thriller Servant

LeeAnna and Lee Ann
 LeeAnna Warner (born 1998), an American girl who disappeared in 2003
 Lee Ann Womack, American country singer

English feminine given names
English given names
Feminine given names